Viswanathan Kumaran (born 1966) is an Indian chemical engineer, rheologist and a professor at the Department of Chemical Engineering of the Indian Institute of Science. He is known for his studies on stability of flow past flexible surfaces and is an elected fellow of the Indian Academy of Sciences, Indian National Science Academy and the Indian National Academy of Engineering. The Council of Scientific and Industrial Research, the apex agency of the Government of India for scientific research, awarded him the Shanti Swarup Bhatnagar Prize for Science and Technology, one of the highest Indian science awards for his contributions to Engineering Sciences in 2000. A recipient of the TWAS Prize in 2014 and the Infosys Prize 2016 in the Engineering and Computer Science category, Kumaran was listed in the Asian Scientist 100, a list of top 100 scientists from Asia, by the Asian Scientist magazine.

Biography 

V. Kumaran, born on 17 June 1966 in the south Indian state of Tamil Nadu, earned his graduate degree in chemical engineering (BTech) from the Indian Institute of Technology, Madras (IITM) in 1987 and moved to the US for his higher studies and secured a PhD in 1991 from Cornell University. His post-doctoral studies were at the University of California, Santa Barbara during 1991–93 and on his return to India, he joined the Indian Institute of Science (IISc) as an assistant professor where he holds the position of a senior professor at the Department of Chemical Engineering and heads V. Kumaran's Research Group.

Legacy 

Kumaran's work is focused on the field of complex flows of complex fluids and he is known to have carried out theoretical and experimental researches on the stability of flow past flexible surfaces. These researches, reported to be of significance in biological applications, microfluidics as well as in the marine and aerospace propulsion, were the first such studies in India and assisted him to demonstrate fluid inertia. The work has also assisted in developing Lab-on-a-chip devices used in cardiovascular and pulmonary Point-of-care diagnostics. He has documented his researches in several articles and the online article repository of the Indian Academy of Sciences has listed 48 of them. Besides, he has authored a book, Dynamics of suspensions with significant inertial effects and has contributed chapters to books edited by others which include Nonlinear Science and Complexity and Rheology of Complex Fluids, both published by Springer.

Kumaran, who has guided a number of master's and doctoral scholars in their studies and hosts many of them in his research group, coordinated the research program on Granular Physics organized by Kavli Institute for Theoretical Physics. He was one of the keynote speakers at The XVth International Congress on Rheology of the Society of Rheology held in August 2008 at Monterey, California, where he presented the theme papers on Rheology of dense sheared granular flows. His research group also hosts MicroX Labs, a start-up company, which won the first prize in the Tata Social Enterprise Challenge in 2013–14. His associations with science journals include memberships in editorial boards of Sadhana of the Indian National Academy of Engineering, Indian Journal of Chemical Technology of National Institute of Science Communication and Information Resources and Soft Materials of Taylor & Francis as well as the editorial advisory board membership of Acta Mechanica of Springer. He has attended several seminars and conferences where he has delivered keynote or invited speeches Chemical Engineering Colloquium of the Indian Institute of Sciences in December 2013, 2015 Annual Meeting of the American Institute of Chemical Engineers, and 68th Annual Meeting of the APS Division of Fluid Dynamics in November, 2015 feature among them.

Awards and honors 
Kumaran received the Young Scientist Medal of the Indian National Science Academy in 1996. The Indian National Academy of Engineering awarded him the Young Engineer Award in 1997, for his contributions in the development of Computer-aided design system for very large scale integrated circuits and work in artificial intelligence; INAE would honor him again in 2006 with an elected fellowship. In 1998, he was elected as a fellow by the Indian Academy of Sciences and he received the Amar Dye-Chem Award of the Indian Institute of Chemical Engineers in 1999. The Council of Scientific and Industrial Research awarded him the Shanti Swarup Bhatnagar Prize, one of the highest Indian science awards in 2000.

Kumaran became an elected fellow of the Indian National Science Academy in 2002 and was selected for the Swarnajayanthi Fellowship of the Department of Science and Technology of India the same year; he received the J. C. Bose National Fellowship of the DST, too, in 2007. Prof. Rustom Choksi Award for Excellence in Research of the Indian Institute of Science reached him 2011 and he shared the 2014 TWAS Prize with Chih-Yuan Lu of Vanguard International Semiconductor Corporation. The American Physical Society, which chose him as the APS-IUSSTF Chair Professor in 2014, elected him as a fellow in 2015 and the Asian Scientist magazine included him in the Asian Scientists 100 list in 2016 for his work on laminarturbulent transition of flow through soft-walled tubes and channels carried out during the year 2015, placing him at 73. The Infosys Science Foundation awarded him the Infosys Prize in 2016 for his research on complex fluids and complex flows and especially in transition and turbulence in soft-walled tubes and channels.

Selected bibliography

Books

Chapters

Articles

Presentations

See also 

 Very-large-scale integration
 Point-of-care testing
 Rheology

Notes

References

External links

Further reading 
 
 

Recipients of the Shanti Swarup Bhatnagar Award in Engineering Science
1966 births
Indian technology writers
Engineers from Tamil Nadu
Academic staff of the Indian Institute of Science
IIT Madras alumni
Cornell University alumni
University of California, Santa Barbara alumni
Indian chemical engineers
Rheologists
Fellows of the Indian Academy of Sciences
Fellows of the Indian National Science Academy
Fellows of the American Physical Society
TWAS laureates
Living people
Fellows of the Indian National Academy of Engineering